19-Nor-5-androstenediol, also known as estr-5-ene-3β,17β-diol, is a synthetic, orally active anabolic-androgenic steroid (AAS) and a derivative of 19-nortestosterone (nandrolone) that was never introduced for medical use. It is an androgen prohormone of nandrolone and of other 19-norandrostanes.

19-Nor-5-androstenediol, 19-nor-5-androstenedione, and other 19-norandrostane prohormones were considered to be nutritional supplements and were sold over-the-counter in the United States as a result of the Dietary Supplement Health and Education Act of 1994 (DSHEA). However, they were banned from sports in 1999 by the International Olympic Committee (IOC) and are currently on the World Anti-Doping Agency (WADA) list of prohibited substances. In 2004, they became controlled substances in the U.S. as a result of the Anabolic Steroid Control Act of 2004.

See also
 List of androgens/anabolic steroids

References

Androgens and anabolic steroids
Diols
Estranes
Estrogens
Prodrugs
Progestogens
World Anti-Doping Agency prohibited substances